Psychiatric Intensive Care Units or PICUs are specialist twenty-four hour inpatient wards that provide intensive assessment and comprehensive treatment to individuals during the most acute phase of a serious mental illness.

Most individuals only stay on PICU wards for a very short time and are moved as soon as the crisis is over or the risky behaviours are under control. 2014 guidance says that the maximum length of stay should be 8 weeks. Normally, patients are discharged to acute psychiatric wards, but some patients go straight home.

PICUs are locked and more secure wards, and have a low patient capacity when compared to open psychiatric wards.  They have higher levels of staffing and are usually single-sex.

PICUs have a diverse range of staff, including: mental health nurses, psychiatrists, psychologists, pharmacists, occupational therapists, social workers, activities co-ordinators, health care support workers, and ward managers.

As facility for the most disturbed patients it may contain a seclusion room for the management of violence and aggression. Other restrictive practices include rapid tranquillisation, ECT and high dose antipsychotics.

References

External links
 NAPICU website
 Journal of Psychiatric Intensive Care

Treatment of mental disorders